Katay, shortened Kata, is a feminine Georgian name. Notable people with the name include:

Katay Bagrationi (fl. 11th century), Georgian royal princess
Katay Bagrationi (fl. 12th century), Georgian royal princess

Georgian feminine given names